ACFI may refer to:

 ACFI feedwater heater, a steam locomotive component
 American Committee of the Fourth International, Socialist Equality Party (United States)
 Arc-fault circuit interrupter, a circuit breaker designed to detect an unintended electrical arc